CDV Software Entertainment AG (formerly CDV Software GmbH, stylized as cdv) was a German publisher of video games founded 1989 in Karlsruhe. On 17 April 2000 cdv became a Frankfurt stock market traded company. In the beginning of the 2000s, CDV was the biggest German publisher in the German video game market. As of the 2006 annual financial statements, the company also reported balance sheet over-indebtedness of EUR 1.9 million, which is, however, covered by a subordinated loan taken out in 2005 (see also mezzanine capital) in the amount of EUR 3.8 million. The company's financial position is based on a balance sheet of EUR 1.9 million. They opened a UK office in 2008. In 2010, VG247 reported that they filed for preliminary insolvency when SouthPeak Games failed to pay a settlement. After only a few employees were still working in the company and the share price had been tumbling for some time, CDV filed for bankruptcy on 12 April 2010.

Published titles 

 American Conquest
 Fight Back (add-on)
 Divided Nation (add-on)
 Blitzkrieg
 Breed
 Codename: Panzers – Phase One
 Codename: Panzers – Phase Two
 Combat Mission: Beyond Overlord
 Combat Mission II: Barbarossa to Berlin
 Combat Mission 3: Afrika Korps
 Cossacks: European Wars
 Cossacks: The Art of War (add-on)
 Cossacks: Back to War (stand-alone add-on)
 Cossacks II: Napoleonic Wars
 Cossacks II: Battle for Europe (stand-alone add-on)
 Divine Divinity
 Glory of the Roman Empire
 Hammer & Sickle
 Hard Truck Apocalypse
 Heaven and Hell
 Lula: The Sexy Empire
 Lula 3D
 Neocron
 Night Watch
 Project Nomads
 Sacred 2: Fallen Angel (North America only)
 Shadowgrounds: Survivor
 Sudden Strike
 Sudden Strike 2
 Sudden Strike 3: Arms for Victory
 The Mystery of the Druids
 ÜberSoldier

References

External links

Press Room for North American media and journalists

Video game publishers
Video game companies established in 1989
Video game companies disestablished in 2010
Defunct video game companies of Germany
German companies established in 1989
German companies disestablished in 2010